Martin Williams (September 25, 1858 – August 27, 1934) was an American Democratic politician who served as a member of the Virginia House of Delegates. He was majority floor leader of the House from 1910 to 1916.

References

External links
 
 

1858 births
1934 deaths
Virginia Democrats